HLA-DQ9 (DQ9) is a human leukocyte antigen serotype within the HLA-DQ (DQ) serotype group. DQ9 is a split antigen of the DQ3 broad antigen. DQ9 is determined by the antibody recognition of β9 and this generally detects the gene product of DQB1*0303.

Serology

The serotyping efficiency of DQ9 is poor. The recognition of DQB1*0303 by DQ9 and or DQ3 is poorest, DQ2 which recognizes a different DQB1 subgroup recognizes DQB1*0303 as efficiently as DQ3. For this reason DQ9 serotyping is a poor method of typing for transplantation or disease association prediction or study.

DQB1*0303
(DQ9) is associated with nasal polyps, gestational diabetes, microscopic polyangiitis (Japanese). Primary linkage is with DRB1*0901-DQB1*0303

Haplotypes and disease

DQ9.2
DQA1*0201:DQB1*0303 is associated with type I psoriasis (vulgaris),

DQ9.3
DQA1*0302:DQB1*0303 maybe associated with juvenile diabetes in the orient.
(Chinese) Primary linkage of vitiligo is with DQA1*03-DQB1*0303.

References

9
9